Group A of 2011-12 Liga Indonesia Premier Division second round was played from 25 to 30 June 2012. The pool was made up of co-host Persepam Pamekasan, Persita Tangerang, Persiku Kudus and PSBK Blitar.

Standings 

{| class=wikitable style="text-align:center"
|-
!width="165"|Team
!width="20"|
!width="20"|
!width="20"|
!width="20"|
!width="20"|
!width="20"|
!width="20"|
!width="20"|
|- 
|- style="background:#cfc;"
|align=left|Persepam Madura United
|3||2||0||1||3||3||0||6
|-
|- style="background:#cfc;"
|align=left|Persita Tangerang
|3||1||2||0||5||3||+2||5
|- style="border-bottom:3px solid red;"
|- 
|align=left|PSBK Blitar
|3||1||1||1||4||3||+1||4
|- 
|align=left|Persiku Kudus
|3||0||1||2||2||5||−3||1
|}

All times local (WIB)

Persita vs Persepam

Persiku vs PSBK

Persita vs Persiku

Persepam vs PSBK

Persiku vs Persepam

PSBK vs Persita

References 

Group A